QSC is an American manufacturer of audio products including power amplifiers, loudspeakers, digital mixers and digital signal processors including the Q-Sys networked audio, video and control platform. QSC products are used by professional installed, portable, production, corporate and cinema customers worldwide.

History
The company was founded in 1968 by Patrick Howe Quilter, who serves as chairman of the board of directors. Quilter was at the time an engineering student with a keen interest in electronics and music. In 1967 Quilter had learned that the bass player in his brother’s high school band was searching for an affordable bass amp. When Quilter learned his budget was $250.00, he said “I could probably make you something for that kind of money,” giving birth to the first QSC amp. With many musician friends and acquaintances seeking him out to make guitar amps, he left school to start his company with the financial backing of family and friends. 

At first the company was a storefront operation in Costa Mesa, California, a combination of manufacturing and retail operations under one roof. The amplifiers were built in the back and sold out front. The first employees were mostly friends helping out.
 The early guitar amplifiers bore names like the Duck Amp and the Quilter Sound Thing. The company adopted the name Quilter Sound Company, which was eventually shortened to the initials "QSC" and was known as QSC Audio Products, Inc. for many years.  The company was officially renamed QSC, LLC in 2015.

Expansion

After some years, the professional power amplifier portion of the business overtook the production of guitar amplifiers. Meanwhile, QSC developed more conventional sales channels in retail music and pro audio stores and also started working with export distributors. Beginning in the early 1980s, Pat Quilter pursued his interest in more electrically efficient methods of power amplification by refining class G (and later, class H) technology as an extension of class AB, primarily for higher-power models.

In the early 1990s, QSC diversified from power amplifiers by starting development of network audio systems for remote control and monitoring of amplifier systems. QSC called its system QSControl (pronounced "Q's Control"). The company was one of the first licensees of the MediaLink networking technology developed by the Lone Wolf Corp. for professional audio systems. MediaLink, however, did not prove robust enough for professional audio users, so by the mid 1990s QSC abandoned it in favor of Ethernet-based networking, which was becoming more affordable and ubiquitous. At about the same time, QSC licensed CobraNet technology from Peak Audio to develop products that would distribute multiple channels of audio signals in the digital domain over common Fast Ethernet media.

In the late 1990s, QSC started a loudspeaker research and development group within its engineering department. Within a couple years, QSC offered loudspeaker systems for sale and is today a major supplier of loudspeaker systems in the professional audio industry.

Recognition
The Orange County Register listed QSC as one of the "Top Work Places" in the county in 2010, 2011, 2012, 2014, and 2015. QSC was ranked 7th out of 20 midsize companies; a total of 85 companies were listed.

Quilter Labs
Patrick Quilter retired from QSC in 2011, and then founded another venture, Quilter Labs, selling "portable, high-power guitar amplifiers" using class-D amplifier technology.

References

External links

Pat Quilter NAMM Oral History Interview (2015)
John Andrews NAMM Oral History Interview (2015)
Barry Andrews NAMM Oral History Interview (2015)
Joe Pham NAMM Oral History Interview (2017)

Audio amplifier manufacturers
Companies based in Costa Mesa, California
Electronics companies established in 1968
Manufacturers of professional audio equipment
Loudspeaker manufacturers
Privately held companies based in California
1968 establishments in California
Audio equipment manufacturers of the United States